Margherita Fumero (born  16 October 1947) is an Italian actress and comedian.

Life and career 
Born in Turin, Fumero became first known as a member of the stage company of Erminio Macario. She achieved a large popularity as the fictional wife of Enrico Beruschi in a series of television variety shows, including Drive In and Sabato al circo, and on stage. 

Fumero also appeared in a number of films, often directed by Bruno Corbucci. In 2012 Fumero released an autobiography, Quattro chiacchiere con Margherita.

Partial filmography 
 Due sul pianerottolo (1976)
 Little Italy (1978)
 The Gang That Sold America (1979) 
 Cat and Dog (1983)
 Classe di ferro (TV, 1989-1991)
 Caméra Café (TV, 2003)

References

External links 
 Official Website: Margheritafumero.com
 

Italian film actresses
Italian television personalities
1947 births
Actors from Turin
Living people
Italian comedians
Mass media people from Turin